"I Can't Stop Loving You (Though I Try)" is a song written by singer-songwriter William Nicholls and first recorded by his short-lived project, White Horse – a collaboration between himself, Kenny Altman, and Jon Lind – and featured on the group's 1977 self-titled album.

The following year, Leo Sayer featured a version on his self-titled album on the Chrysalis label. It reached number six on the UK Singles Chart and was classified silver. In 2002, Phil Collins also covered the song, as "Can't Stop Loving You". His version reached number 28 on the UK Singles Chart. For other versions of the song, see section below.

Release history

The Leo Sayer single was released in 1978 with "No Looking Back" as the b-side.

Charts

Personnel 
 Leo Sayer – vocals
 Greg Phillinganes – acoustic piano
 Steve Porcaro – synthesizers
 Waddy Wachtel – electric guitar, acoustic guitar
 Leland Sklar – bass
 Russ Kunkel – drums
 Lenny Castro – congas
 David Campbell – string arrangements

Phil Collins version

"Can't Stop Loving You" was the lead single from English singer Phil Collins’ solo album Testify, released in 2002. It also appears on Collins’ 2004 album Love Songs: A Compilation... Old and New. Although it received minor airplay, the song became Collins’ eighth number-one Billboard adult contemporary hit. The song also reached the number ten on the Eurochart.

Collins originally recorded the song in 2000 for a love songs project, along with "Least You Can Do", but both tracks were released on Testify instead.  Collins' version has some minor changes in the lyrics and introduces a bridge after the second chorus.

Track listing
 "Can't Stop Loving You" – 4:18
 "High Flying Angel" (U.S. single and Japan Testify only) – 4:44

Charts

Weekly charts

Year-end charts

Certifications

Personnel 
 Phil Collins – vocals, drums, percussion 
 Jamie Muhoberac – keyboards
 Daryl Stuermer – lead guitar
 Tim Pierce – rhythm guitar
 Paul Bushnell – bass guitar

See also
List of Billboard Adult Contemporary number ones of 2002

References

External links
 
 

1978 singles
2002 singles
Leo Sayer songs
Rock ballads
Phil Collins songs
Chrysalis Records singles
Atlantic Records singles
Songs written by Billy Nicholls
Song recordings produced by Rob Cavallo
1978 songs